Arababad may refer to:
 Arababad, Alborz
 Arababad-e Khosravi, Alborz Province
 Arababad, Semirom, Isfahan Province
 Arababad, Kerman
 Arababad, Rafsanjan, Kerman Province
 Arababad, Dargaz, Razavi Khorasan Province
 Arababad, South Khorasan